The International Movement for Monetary Reform is a worldwide umbrella organization for monetary reform organizations with member organizations in 27 countries, founded in 2013 at the initiative of the British organization Positive Money. Their political goal is to replace the creation of money by bank lending with a system that creates money free of debt.

References

External links

See also 
 Monetary reform
 Money creation
 Credit theory of money
 Money as Debt
 List of monetary reformers
 Criticisms of fractional reserve banking

Monetary reform